The 1979 LSU Tigers football team represented Louisiana State University (LSU) during the 1979 NCAA Division I-A football season.  Under head coach Charles McClendon, the Tigers had a record of 7–5 with a Southeastern Conference record of 4–2. It was McClendon's 18th and final season as head coach at LSU.

Bo Rein, who led NC State to the 1979 Atlantic Coast Conference championship, was hired six days after the regular season finale, but McClendon and his staff coached the Tangerine Bowl vs. Wake Forest. Rein perished in a bizarre plane crash January 10, 1980, only 42 days after his hiring and was succeeded by former LSU All-American Jerry Stovall.

Schedule

Roster

References

LSU
LSU Tigers football seasons
Citrus Bowl champion seasons
LSU Tigers football